Jeremy Leven (born August 16, 1941) is an American screenwriter, director, producer, and novelist. Born in South Bend, Indiana, Leven lives in Woodbridge, Connecticut, Paris, and New York City.

Early life
Leven was educated at St. John's College in Annapolis, Maryland, Harvard University, the University of Connecticut and Yale University Medical School.  While at Harvard, he founded a satirical revue called The Proposition that ran for 10 years in Cambridge, Massachusetts and off-Broadway.

Career
Leven's first novel, Creator, was published in 1980 and released as a film of the same title in 1985.  Leven was a practicing neuropsychiatrist, a theme incorporated in his second novel, Satan: His Psychotherapy and Cure by the Unfortunate Dr. Kassler, J.S.P.S., which was published in 1982 and filmed as Crazy as Hell in 2002.  His third and most recent novel,  The Savior and the Singing Machine, was published in January 2019.

Leven wrote and directed Don Juan DeMarco (1994), wrote and produced Alex & Emma (2003), wrote the screenplays for The Legend of Bagger Vance (2000), The Notebook (2004), My Sister's Keeper (2009), and Real Steel (2011), and did uncredited writing on The Time Traveler's Wife (2009). Recently, Leven wrote and directed Girl on a Bicycle (2013).

Awards

"Connie Award" Outstanding Achievement in Film, Connecticut Film Commission 1999
"Meilleur Sceneriste" (Best Screenwriter) -- European Award conferred by Prince Albert of Monaco 2003
"Lifetime Achievement - Excellence in Screenwriting", Sedona International Film Festival 2014
"Special Award for Outstanding Achievement", SunDeis Film Festival, Brandeis University, 2006

References
 Contemporary Authors, Thompson Gale, 2004

External links
 

1941 births
Living people
20th-century American novelists
American male novelists
American male screenwriters
Novelists from Connecticut
St. John's College (Annapolis/Santa Fe) alumni
Harvard University alumni
University of Connecticut alumni
Yale School of Medicine alumni
Film directors from Indiana
Writers from South Bend, Indiana
20th-century American male writers
Novelists from Indiana
Screenwriters from Indiana
Screenwriters from Connecticut
Film producers from Indiana